Aoteatilia amphipsila is a species of sea snail, a marine gastropod mollusk in the family Columbellidae.

Description

Distribution

References

 Suter, H. (1908a) Descriptions of new species of New Zealand marine shells. Proceedings of the Malacological Society of London, 8, 178–191, pl. 7
 Spencer, H.G., Marshall, B.A. & Willan, R.C. (2009). Checklist of New Zealand living Mollusca. pp 196–219. in: Gordon, D.P. (ed.) New Zealand inventory of biodiversity. Volume one. Kingdom Animalia: Radiata, Lophotrochozoa, Deuterostomia. Canterbury University Press, Christchurch.

amphipsila
Gastropods described in 1908